Salvatore Longo (born 19 May 2000) is an Italian football player. He plays for  club Turris.

Club career

Fiorentina
He is a product of Fiorentina youth teams and started playing for their Under-19 squad in the 2017–18 season. He was not called up to the senior squad in 2017–18 and 2018–19 seasons.

Loan to Bisceglie
On 2 August 2019 he joined Serie C club Bisceglie on loan.

He made his professional Serie C debut for Bisceglie on 25 August 2019 in a game against Rende. He started the game and was substituted in the 71st minute.

Turris
On 1 July 2021, he signed a three-year contract with Serie C club Turris.

References

External links
 

2000 births
Sportspeople from Catania
Living people
Italian footballers
Association football forwards
A.S. Bisceglie Calcio 1913 players
Serie C players
21st-century Italian people